CéU is the self-titled debut album of Brazilian singer/songwriter CéU. Nominated for “Best Contemporary World Music Album (Vocal or Instrumental)” of the year 2007.

It was as well the first international act released by Starbucks on their Hear Music Debut CD Series.

Track listing

Release history

References

2005 albums
Céu albums